Adhanur  is a village in Thuraiyur taluk of Tiruchirappalli district in Tamil Nadu, India.

Demographics 

As per the 2001 census, Adhanur had a population of 1,904 with 971 males and 933 females. The sex ratio was 961 and the literacy rate, 64.16.
In this Panchayat called ulloor village fully followed THOTTAMAL samy.

References 

 

Villages in Tiruchirappalli district